A list of notable flat horse races which take place annually in Scandinavia, including all conditions races which currently hold Group status in the European Pattern.

Group 3

Other races

References
 tjcis.com – Group races in Scandinavia.
 tjcis.com – Listed races in Scandinavia.

Horse racing in Denmark
Horse racing in Norway
Horse racing in Sweden